La Virgen de los Remedios de Pampanga also known as Indu ning Capaldanan, Tula ding Kapampangan is a Marian title of the Blessed Virgin Mary venerated by Capampangan Catholics as the official patroness of Pampanga, Philippines.

The paired devotion along with a crucifix called Santo Cristo del Perdón is highlighted in a prayer apostolate known as Crusaders for Penance and Charity, a prayer group started by women which focused on Catholic social justice for the poor and the destitute, and was originally founded to combat against the spread  of Communism.

History  
In the 1950s after the Second World War, the province of Pampanga was plagued with Communism which threatened both the Catholic religion and social order in the Philippines. The lower and the middle class laity conflicted with wealthy landowners, which caused much political unrest in the region.

The first Bishop of San Fernando, Caesar Maria Guerrero y Rodriguez decided to revive the Marian devotion (introduced to Manila and Pampanga in 1574 by the Spanish) in an attempt to ease tensions. Guerrero was a native of Malate, Manila, where the local church enshrined a similar image of Our Lady of Remedies.

Bishop Guerrero requested the image of the Virgen de los Remedios, already venerated as Our Lady of Remedies from Baliti, Pampanga to be borrowed by San Fernando to help with a new apostolate working towards peace and reconciliation, called Cruzada de Penitencia y Caridad (Crusade of Penance and Charity). Great piety and monetary donations were garnered primarily due to the wealthy noblewomen and widows who contributed into the religious group, along with the consistent religious processions and recitations of Rosary which made the devotion popular among the masses. A system of bylaws for the apostolate was created, making the group more organized and official which helped it to grow and increased ecclesiastical recognition.

By 1954, the people of Baliti, Pampanga, became adamant in requesting that their image be returned to their town. As a result, Bishop Guerrero commissioned the santero artist Victoriano Siongco to carve out a larger image of the Immaculate Conception for the official use of the Crusade, and the Baliti image was returned to its original parish.

Pontifical coronation 

On 11 February 1956, Bishop Caesar Maria y Guerrero submitted a petition to Cardinal Federico Tedeschini, who at the time was the Apostolic Dataria to Pope Pius XII requesting to grant a canonical coronation. 

Pope Pius XII issued the pontifical decree on the canonical coronation of the image on 15 July 1956. The bull was signed by Secretary Deacon of the Vatican Chapter, Giulio Rossi and notarized by the Secretary to the Apostolic Dataria, Marco Martini.  The rite of coronation was executed on 8 September 1956, which now commemorates the same day of its current feast.

Feast and veneration  
The Feast of Virgen de los Remedios of Pampanga is celebrated each 8 September, the Nativity of Mary. In the United States, the Archbishop of Los Angeles, California crowns a replica of the image each year at the Cathedral of Our Lady of the Angels.

In 2010, Capampangans in the Bay Area also started with an annual re-enactment of the canonical coronation. The initial coronation was held at the Our Lady of Peace Shrine in Santa Clara, California. Since then, the event rotates through the Diocese of San Jose, Diocese of Oakland and the Archdiocese of San Francisco and is held every second Sunday of November.

See also
 Our Lady of Guidance
 Santo Niño de Cebu
 Santo

References

External links
 

Titles of Mary
Marian devotions
Catholic Church in the Philippines
Religion in Pampanga
Marian feast days